In geometry, the great stellated truncated dodecahedron (or quasitruncated great stellated dodecahedron or great stellatruncated dodecahedron) is a nonconvex uniform polyhedron, indexed as U66. It has 32 faces (20 triangles and 12 decagrams), 90 edges, and 60 vertices. It is given a Schläfli symbol t0,1{5/3,3}.

Related polyhedra 

It shares its vertex arrangement with three other uniform polyhedra: the small icosicosidodecahedron, the small ditrigonal dodecicosidodecahedron, and the small dodecicosahedron:

Cartesian coordinates 
Cartesian coordinates for the vertices of a great stellated truncated dodecahedron are all the even permutations of

 (0, ±τ, ±(2−1/τ))
 (±τ, ±1/τ, ±2/τ)
 (±1/τ2, ±1/τ, ±2)

where τ = (1+)/2 is the golden ratio (sometimes written φ).

See also 
 List of uniform polyhedra

References

External links 
 

Uniform polyhedra